Austral (Reo Tuha'a pae) is an endangered Polynesian language or a dialect continuum that is spoken by approximately 8,000 people (1987). It is spoken only on the Austral Islands and the Society Islands of French Polynesia. The language is also referred to as Tubuai-Rurutu, Tubuai, Rurutu-Tupuai, or Tupuai. In structure, it is similarly compared to Tahitian.

History 
Those who originally spoke Austral were the Tubuaians, the people of Tubuai. The island has been inhabited since at least 1215CE.

The first European to visit Tubuai was James Cook in 1777, though he did not land. The next Europeans to arrive were the mutineers of HMS Bounty in 1789. After establishing a fort, the mutineers degenerated into raiding local villages to kidnap women, and left after two months. Mutineer James Morrison recorded the population of Tubuai as "3000 souls". When Christian missionaries arrived thirty years later, the population had been reduced to just 300 people.   One Protestant minister when visiting a congregation on Tubuai on January 3, 1824, wrote that several islanders were still suffering from a devastating illness. He described the symptoms and noted that several hundred had died within the previous four years. As a result, some traditional practices, beliefs, and languages have been lost or have struggled to survive. The languages of the Austral area still lack official recognition, as of 2015.

Genetic classification 
Austral is sorted into the Austronesian family, which contains a majority of the Pacific languages. This family is divided into 15 subcategories, starting with Austronesian and ending with Tahitic. Specifically, it is broken down into Austronesian, Central-Eastern Malayo-Polynesian, Eastern Malayo-Polynesian, Oceanic, Central-Eastern Oceanic, Remote Oceanic, Central Pacific, East Fijian-Polynesian, Polynesian, Nuclear, East, Central, and Tahitic.

Status 
The Austral language is classified as "threatened" in the Catalogue of Endangered Languages. With less than 6% of the French Polynesian population speaking Austral, its Ethnologue status is also deemed to be "shifting". This means that the language is staying only within one generation and not being taught to their descendants. Another cause of the Austral language dissipation is that those who speak Austral are now speaking Tahitian. This alteration took place because Tahitian is better known and is spoken by more people in the region, while Austral is seen as futile as only a low percentage of people speak it.

Dialects 
There are four dialects in the Austral language: Ra'ivavae, Rimatara, Rurutu, and Tubuai (also known as Tupuai). Each of these are spoken in their corresponding islands: Raivavae, Rimatara, and Rurutu, except for the Tubuai dialect: it is extinct, replaced by Tahitian.

Phonology 
The phonology of the dialects of the Austral language varies significantly. The Rurutu and Ra'ivavae dialects, for example, have only eight consonant phonemes, making it relatively difficult to understand even for speakers of Tahitian, another Polynesian language. The Ra'ivavae dialect is also unusual in that its rhotic consonant has evolved into a voiced velar stop consonant, similar to the hard "g" sound in English.

All dialects have the same five vowels (with long variants) similar to practically all Polynesian languages.

Sample verbs

References

Languages of French Polynesia
Tahitic languages
Language
Endangered Austronesian languages